Raymondiceratinae is a subfamily of Upper Devonian cheiloceratid goniatites in which the sutures have 4 distinct lobes and the growth lines are convex.  The subfamily includes three genera.

Raymondiceras. named by Schindewolf, 1934  which has a subglubular shell with small closed umbilici and sutures with an incipient lobe in the first lateral saddle. Type genus. 
Melonites named  by Bogoslovskii 1971, which was moved from Cheiloceratidae to Raymondiceratineae by Korn & Klug, 2002.

References
  
Goniat-Raymondiceratinae

Cheiloceratidae
Late Devonian first appearances
Late Devonian animals
Late Devonian extinctions